The Ziklokross Igorre is a cyclo-cross race held in Igorre, Spain, which was part of the UCI Cyclo-cross World Cup from 2005 to 2011, as well as in 1993, 1994, 1995 and 2001. The race was downgraded to category C2 in 2012, then to amateur status in 2014 and 2015, before being reinstated as a C2 since 2016.

Past winners
In yellow: amateur editions

References
 Results

UCI Cyclo-cross World Cup
Cyclo-cross races
Cycle races in the Basque Country
Recurring sporting events established in 1977
1977 establishments in Spain
Sport in Biscay